Robert K. Citrone (born 1964) is an American billionaire hedge fund manager, the co-founder of Discovery Capital Management, and minority owner of the Pittsburgh Steelers.

Early life
Robert Citrone was born in Latrobe, Pennsylvania, and grew up in Pittsburgh.

Citrone has a bachelor's degree from Hampden-Sydney College, and an MBA from the Darden School of Business.

Career
In 1990, Citrone was hired as a corporate-bond analyst at Fidelity Investments. He resigned from Fidelity in 1995 and joined Tiger Management. In 1999, Citrone co-founded Discovery Capital Management.

Personal life
Citrone has four children with his wife, Cindy. He and Cindy are minority owners of the Pittsburgh Steelers. In 2016, Robert and Cindy were awarded the Dr. Freddie Fu Sports Leadership Award for giving back to their hometown.

References

Tiger Management
1960s births
Living people
American billionaires
21st-century American businesspeople
People from Southport, Connecticut
People from Latrobe, Pennsylvania
Hampden–Sydney College alumni